The 2017–18 Kansas Jayhawks men's basketball team represented the University of Kansas in the 2017–18 NCAA Division I men's basketball season, which was the Jayhawks' 120th basketball season. The Jayhawks, were members of the Big 12 Conference and played their home games at Allen Fieldhouse in Lawrence, Kansas. They were led by 15th year Hall of Fame head coach Bill Self.

On October 22, the Jayhawks renewed their rivalry against Missouri in an exhibition game for charity. The proceeds of the game went to four different charities for Hurricane Harvey and Hurricane Maria relief funds. It was the first time the teams played since Missouri left the Big 12 for the SEC.

The Jayhawks entered the season ranked 4th, their 162nd consecutive poll they have been ranked in. During the season, they extended the streak to, as of the poll released on March 12, 2018, 180 consecutive polls. The last game KU played as unranked team was a 66–61 win over Colorado on January 31, 2009. With their 74–72 win over Texas Tech on February 24, 2018, the Jayhawks clinched their NCAA record 14th consecutive Big 12 regular season championship.  The season marked the first time the Jayhawks have ever been swept in the regular season by an opponent under Bill Self, ending what was a streak of 103 home and home series without a sweep dating back to 2001. The Jayhawks lost to Self's alma mater Oklahoma State twice. With 3:49 left in the 2nd half of their Big 12 Tournament Quarterfinal game against Oklahoma State, red-shirt sophomore guard Malik Newman made a 3-point shot. That 3 point was the Jayhawks school record 319th made 3 point shot in the season, breaking a record the Jayhawks set the previous season.

They received an automatic bid to the NCAA tournament as the No. 1 seed in the Midwest region. There they defeated Penn, Seton Hall, Clemson, and Duke to advance to the Final Four. In the Final Four, they lost to No. 1 seed from the East region and eventual National Champions, Villanova.

Senior guard Devonte' Graham was named a Consensus First Team All-American. He was the 23rd different player to be named a Consensus First Team All-American and the 30th overall selection in Kansas history. It was also the 2nd consecutive year Kansas had a Consensus First Team All-American.

Roster and coaching staff changes

Coaching staff changes
The Jayhawks did not experience any changes to their coaching staff.

Graduation

Early draft entrants

Hired agent

Did not initially hire agent
Starting with the 2016 NBA draft, if a player declares for the draft, but does not hire an agent, it allows the player to return to their school even after participating in the NBA Draft Combine, as long as they withdraw from the draft no later than 10 days after the end of the combine. For the 2017 draft, the final withdrawal date to retain NCAA eligibility was May 24.

Transfers

Incoming

Outgoing

Recruiting class

|-
| colspan="7" style="padding-left:10px;" | Overall recruiting rankings:     Scout: 14     Rivals: 10       ESPN: 24 
|}

Transfers

|-
|}

Walk-ons

Left team during the season

NCAA Corruption scandal, FBI Probe

On February 23, 2018, Kansas was announced as one of 27 schools that had players being investigated by the FBI's probe into corruption in college basketball which began with an investigation of Louisville and their former head coach Rick Pitino. Kansas' involvement was specifically a former player being named in Christian Dawkins' expense reports for seeking thousands of dollars of reimbursements for expenses incurred from recruits families. Former player Josh Jackson's mother reportedly received a $2,700 payment, which was listed in the report. Also named in the report were fellow Kansas Division I team Wichita State, Big 12 members Iowa State and Texas, as well as perennial power house programs Duke, North Carolina, Kentucky, and Michigan State.

Roster

Schedule and results

|-
!colspan=12 style=|Italy exhibition trip
 
 
 
 
|-
!colspan=12 style=|Exhibition

 

|-
!colspan=12 style=| Regular season
 
 
 

 

 
 
 
 
 
 
 
 

|-
!colspan=12 style=| Big 12 Tournament
 

|-
!colspan=12 style=""| 

Source:

Rankings

*AP does not release post-NCAA tournament rankings.

Post-season awards
Bill Self
Big 12 Co-Coach of the Year

Devonte Graham
Big 12 Player of the Year
1st Team All-Big 12
Consensus 1st Team All-American
NCAA Tournament All-Midwest Regional team

Malik Newman
Big 12 Newcomer of the Year
Big 12 All-Newcomer Team
Big 12 Tournament Most Outstanding Player
NCAA Tournament Midwest Regional Most Outstanding Player
NCAA Tournament All-Midwest Regional team

Sviatoslav Mykhailiuk
2nd Team All-Big 12

Udoka Azubuike
3rd Team All-Big 12

LaGerald Vick
Honorable Mention All-Big 12

Clay Young
Academic All-Big 12

Primary source unless otherwise noted:

References

Kansas Jayhawks men's basketball seasons
Kansas
2017 in sports in Kansas
2018 in sports in Kansas
Kansas
NCAA Division I men's basketball tournament Final Four seasons